The Standing Committee of the National People's Congress (NPCSC) is the permanent body of the National People's Congress (NPC), the national legislature of China. Although the parent NPC officially has superiority over the Standing Committee, and certain authorities are not delegated, the Standing Committee is generally viewed to have more power, albeit inferior to its parent, as the NPC convenes only once a year for two weeks, leaving its Standing Committee the only body that regularly drafts and approves decisions and laws.

History 
In 1954, the 1st National People's Congress was held in Beijing, which became the statutory parliament of the People's Republic of China. The Standing Committee was established as its permanent body. The 1954 Constitution of the People's Republic of China stipulates that "the National People's Congress is the sole organ that exercises the legislative power of the state" and that the Standing Committee of the National People's Congress has only the power to "interpret laws" and "enact decrees" However, because the number of delegates to the National People's Congress is in the thousands and non-full-time, only one meeting is held annually, and the meeting period cannot be too long. The 2nd NPC authorized its Standing Committee the power to exercise legislative power when the NPC is not in session.

During the political chaos of the Cultural Revolution, the NPC rarely held meetings and the Standing Committee virtually ceased to function. During this period, Chairman Zhu De and First Vice Chairman Dong Biwu had both died, which enabled Vice Chairman Soong Ching Ling, a member of the Revolutionary Committee of the Kuomintang, to exercise the functions and powers of Chairman of the NPCSC to a certain extent. With the abolition of the presidency in 1975, she effectively became the first female head of state in China by legal definition.

In 1980, after the decision of the 5th National People's Congress, the "Committee for the Amendment of the Constitution of the People's Republic of China" was formally established, presided over by Ye Jianying, Soong Ching Ling and Peng Zhen, and including the main leaders of the democratic parties, social organizations and jurists. It was responsible for amending and establishing the new constitution. During the discussion on constitutional amendment, Hu Qiaomu, secretary general of the Constitution Revision Committee, proposed cutting the number of NPC deputies to 1,000 and setting up two chambers of 500 each under the NPC to make the NPC a permanent, bicameral body, in an attempt to change its image as a "rubber stamp". Another committee member proposed to imitate the system used by the Supreme Soviet of the Soviet Union with one chamber composed of representatives from different regions and the other composed of representatives from different professional sectors. Opponents, led by Deng Xiaoping and Ye Jianying, argued that "if the two parties disagree, it will be very troublesome to coordinate and difficult to operate". A compromise was finally reached that greatly expanded the powers of the Standing Committee of the National People's Congress, making it a permanent legislature with the power to enact most laws and to review those for approval by the NPC.

Composition 
The Standing Committee is elected by and from the representatives of the NPC. It currently has 175 members. The term of office of a member of the NPC Standing Committee is the same as that of the current NPC, and is generally five years. It remains in power until the succeeding NPC elects its standing committee. The NPCSC meets every two months with each session of the committee lasting a week. It convenes the NPC once a year, and may do so when it finds it necessary or with a proposal from one fifth of NPC's members. Members of the NPCSC must not, at the same time, hold executive, judicial, or supervisory positions. In contrast, members of the NPC do not have this restriction.

It is led by a chairman, mainland China's top legislator, who is conventionally ranked third in mainland China's political ranking system, after the general secretary of the Chinese Communist Party and the premier of the People's Republic of China. The chairman since 2023 is Zhao Leji.

For a while after establishment of the People's Republic, the power of the Standing Committee was limited to interpretation of its constitution and laws. At present, the NPC Standing Committee plays a key role in legislation and has the power to promulgate and amend most laws and decrees. Bills voted on by the National People's Congress are usually submitted by the Standing Committee after its third reading.

Deputies of the Standing Committee are made up of those from parties represented in the whole of Congress, and thus their faction leaders in the NPC serve the same function there as leaders of the parties having seats.

Functions and powers

Legislative 
The NPC and its Standing Committee jointly exercise the power to enact laws in China. The legislative rights of the Standing Committee mainly include: drafting and revising laws except those to be enacted only by the full congress of the NPC; partially supplementing and amending, when the NPC is not in session, laws enacted by the NPC, provided that the basic principles of these laws are not contravened. As a result, a large amount of the legislative work is conducted by the Standing Committee. Although the NPC has the power to revoke "inappropriate decisions" made by the Standing Committee, so far this power has never been used. As a result, the NPC Standing Committee often has a greater say in legislative deliberations.

The NPCSC has the power of judicial interpretation of the constitution and law in the PRC, including the Basic Law of Hong Kong and Macau. In contrast to common law jurisdiction in which stare decisis gives the power of both final interpretation and adjudication to a supreme court, within mainland China constitutional and legal interpretation is considered to be a legislative activity rather than a judicial one, and the functions are split so that the NPCSC provides legal interpretations while the Supreme People's Court actually decides cases. Because an interpretation of the NPCSC is legislative in nature and not judicial, it does not affect cases which have already been decided.

Supervisory 

The NPC Standing Committee has the power to supervise the enforcement of the Constitution. It supervises the work of the State Council, the Central Military Commission, the National Supervisory Commission, the Supreme People’ s Court and the Supreme People’s Procuratorate. It has the power to annul administrative regulations, decisions and orders of the State Council that go against the Constitution and other laws, and to annul local regulations or decisions of the organs of state power of provinces, autonomous regions and municipalities directly under the central government that contravene the Constitution, other laws or administrative regulations.

Power to decide upon major state issues 
When the NPC is not in session, the Standing Committee examines and approves partial adjustments to the plan for national economic and social development or to the state budget that prove necessary in the course of their implementation. The Standing Committee decides whether to ratify or abrogate treaties and important agreements reached with other countries. It institutes systems of titles and ranks for military and diplomatic personnel, and other specific titles and ranks, state medals and titles of honor as well as the granting of special pardons.

The NPCSC decides on general or partial mobilization, and on entering into a state of emergency throughout China or in particular provinces, autonomous regions or municipalities directly under the central government. When the NPC is not in session, the Standing Committee decides whether to proclaim a state of war in the event of an armed attack on China or in fulfillment of international treaty obligations concerning a common defense against aggression.

Meetings and procedures 
The NPC Standing Committee usually holds a committee session once every two months, usually late in even-numbered months. It may also hold interim sessions if there is a special need. The meetings are convened and chaired by the NPC Standing Committee Chairperson. The chairperson may delegate a vice-chairperson to preside over the meeting on his or her behalf. A meeting of the Standing Committee may not be held unless a quorum is met of more than half of the members of the Standing Committee present. The Council of Chairpersons shall draft the agenda for a meeting of the Standing Committee and refer it to a plenary session of the Standing Committee for a decision.

According to law, a bill may be proposed by the Chairperson's Council, or submitted by the State Council, the Central Military Commission, the Supreme People's Court, the Supreme People's Procuratorate and deputies of the special committees of the National People's Congress (or the committee chairmen of these). Ten or more members of the Standing Committee may also sign and introduce a bill. After the bill is introduced, the Chairman's Council shall decide on the agenda of the Standing Committee's meeting. The Chairman's Council may refer the bill to the relevant special committee for deliberation and submit a report before deciding to put it on the agenda of the Standing Committee. It also has the right to vote to reject the bill proposed by the above-mentioned body. When the Chairman's Council rejects a bill, it shall explain the reasons to the Standing Committee and the bill sponsor.

A bill put on the agenda of a Standing Committee session shall be deliberated by the Standing Committee for three times before it is submitted to a vote. At the first reading, an explanation of the legislative bill made by its sponsor shall be heard in a plenary session of the Standing Committee and then it shall be preliminarily deliberated at group meetings. At the second reading, a report of the Constitution and Law Committee on the revision of the draft law and main problems concerned shall be heard in a plenary meeting, and then the legislative bill shall be further deliberated at group meetings. At the third reading, a report of the Constitution and Law Committee on the results of its deliberation over the draft law shall be heard in a plenary meeting, and then the revised draft of the law shall be deliberated at group meetings. After the revised draft law has been deliberated at the meetings of the Standing Committee, the Constitution and Law Committee revises it in accordance with the deliberation opinions of the Standing Committee members and prepares the final version to be voted on. The Council of Chairpersons then refers the legislative bill to the Standing Committee for a vote. If the Standing Committee fails to reach an agreement on the bill during the third reading, it shall convene joint group meetings and plenary meetings for further discussion, or invite relevant personage, experts and scholars to hold hearings regarding the bill. After reaching an agreement, it is sent for the vote in a plenary session.

For a bill that has been put on the agenda of the session of the Standing Committee, after each deliberation of the session of the Standing Committee, the draft law and the explanation of its drafting and amendment will be published on the website of the People's Republic of China or the Chinese Government Legal Information Network for public comment.

When voting, the NPC Standing Committee meeting adopts the absolute majority system, that is, more than half of the committee members present in a session thus producing a quorum, and more than half of the committee members voted in favor, then the bill can be passed. When an affirmative vote and an abstention vote are equal, the chairman has no right to cast a decision vote, and the bill is vetoed.

In fact, although most of the bills deliberated by the Standing Committee of the National People's Congress (NPCSC) have been agreed upon at the third reading, there are still some bills that have been rejected at the voting stage in the history of the Standing Committee of the NPC. For example, in 1989, the Standing Committee of the National People's Congress vetoed the Organic Law of the Urban Residents Committees of the People's Republic of China (Draft) due to different opinions on the wording of the provisions of the bill. For example, in 1999, the Standing Committee of the National People's Congress rejected the Highway Law of the People's Republic of China (Amendment) with 77 votes in favor, 6 against, 42 abstentions and 29 people not participating in the voting, which was just 50% of the total votes.

Cases

Regulations on Hong Kong 
A notable use of the constitutional interpretation power occurred in 1999 over the right of abode issue in the Hong Kong Special Administrative Region in Lau Kong Yung v. Director of Immigration. The NPCSC interpreted the Basic Law of Hong Kong in accordance with the position taken by the Hong Kong government with respect to the eligibility of permanent residency in Hong Kong.

In 2014, the NPCSC set rules for the election of the chief executive of Hong Kong, a decision that was widely opposed by the pro-democracy camp and led to the Umbrella Revolution.

In 2016, the NPCSC ruled that Hong Kong lawmakers who take their oath improperly could be immediately disqualified.

In June 2020, the NPCSC created and passed the Hong Kong National Security Law, legislation that was kept secret until shortly before it took effect. In November 2020, Carrie Lam sought help from the NPCSC to give authority for the Hong Kong government to disqualify 4 pro-democracy lawmakers from the Legislative Council.

In December 2020, it was reported that the NPCSC would move to diminish opposition from district councillors, by unseating those who "breached the red line" and also by removing the 117 seats belonging to district councillors in the chief executive election committee. Earlier in December 2019, Carrie Lam said that the opposition district councillors would be treated the same as those from the pro-Beijing camp, and that "There is no question of the government’s commitment to continue to respect the roles and functions of the district council."

In March 2021, the NPCSC approved changes to Hong Kong's electoral system, allowing only "patriots" to serve in the government, and also reducing democratic representation.

In December 2022, after John Lee asked the NPCSC whether Jimmy Lai could hire a foreign lawyer, the NPCSC ruled that foreign lawyers could only be hired for national security cases if approved by the chief executive or by the Committee for Safeguarding National Security.

Chairman and vice chairpersons of the 13th NPCSC 
Elected by the 13th National People's Congress at its 1st session's 4th plenary meeting on March 17, 2018:

 Chairman
 Zhao Leji (b. March 1957): 3rd-ranked member of the Politburo Standing Committee of the Chinese Communist Party.

 Vice chairpersons (14)
 Li Hongzhong (b. August 1956): member of the CCP Politburo
 Wang Dongming (b. July 1956)
 Xiao Jie (b. June 1957)
 Zheng Jianbang (b. January 1957): chairman of the Revolutionary Committee of the Chinese Kuomintang.
 Ding Zhongli (b. January 1957): chairman of the China Democratic League.
 Hao Mingjin (b. December 1956): chairman of the China National Democratic Construction Association.
 Cai Dafeng (b. 1960): chairman of the China Association for Promoting Democracy.
 He Wei (b. December 1955): chairman of the Chinese Peasants' and Workers' Democratic Party.
 Wu Weihua (b. September 1956): chairman of Jiusan Society.
 Tie Ning (Tibetan, b. September 1957)
 Peng Qinghua (b. April 1957)
 Zhang Qingwei (b. November 1957)
 Losang Jamcan (b. July 1957): member of the 18th CCCPC; the former chairman of the Standing Committee of the Tibet Autonomous Region People's Congress, and the Chairman of the Tibet Autonomous Region.
 Shohrat Zakir (b. August 1953): former chairman of Xinjiang.

See also 
 Chairman of the Standing Committee of the National People's Congress
 Presidium of the Supreme Soviet, a Soviet Union institution, after which Standing Committee of the NPC was modelled.
 Legislative Yuan, the Republic of China legislative counterpart.

References 

National People's Congress
Law of the People's Republic of China
China, National People's Congress